In marketing, contact center telephony is the communication and collaboration system used by businesses to either manage high volumes of inbound queries or outbound telephone calls keeping their workforce or agents productive and in control to serve or acquire customers. This business communication system is an extension of computer telephony integration (CTI).

Overview
The interactions between callers and customer service representatives are supported by the collective system of computers, telephones and the Internet. The shift from CTI to contact center telephony is marked by the sheer change in the customer’s behavior when it comes to communication. Means customers are no longer confined only to voice-based communication i.e. phone to connect with their customer service departments. In addition, they are making use of email, SMS, chat, social media, and other virtual contact channels. This is also the reason for the shift in nomenclature from "call centers" to "contact centers", "contact" being a wider term than "call". Respecting the trend, contact center owners need to adopt unified communication or multi-channel approach to let customers get in touch with them via their preferred communication mediums, either voice or non-voice (data). Cloud-based phone system is a further advancement in the direction as it allows operators to access all the features and benefits of call center telephony over the Web against an affordable & flexible pay-as-you-go subscription model. Thus, in-house infrastructure deployment to manage public switched telephone networks, storage, communication applications, and collaboration servers is no more an obligation. Neither is the need to invest resources for their upgrade, repair, maintenance and security as cloud vendor would be responsible for the same.

India
India, a popular call center business process outsourcing destination, often uses a cloud-based phone system in order to cut operational expenses and downtime, and increase connectivity.

Promotion

Businesses can rely on contact center telephony services to respond to their customers’ queries over phone, email, chat, fax, etc. Integrating it with their customer relationship management tools, entire contact details of customers and their interaction sessions with different customer service representatives can be found at one place. The combination can manage not just sales and marketing but also deliver excellent post-sales customer service or technical support to allow customers derive the most from their products or services. Hence, it’s becoming instrumental in increasing customer satisfaction and loyalty and most of the call center services in India are taking refuge from it.

The entire contact center telephony service can be availed by professionals over a browser. Hence, businesses can leverage the concept of BYOD (bring your own device) and mobility and serve their customers well using mobile applications. According to market analysts, BYOD increases satisfaction among workforce, and hence their individual and collective productivity as well. BYOD programme significantly reduces the TCO (total cost of ownership) as professionals prefer to work with their own devices rather than using company-provisioned devices.  Next, they tend to be more caring towards such devices and can even shell out money to update and upgrade those when required.

Integration of IM, along with audio and video conferencing services helps call center or contact center representatives to get real time assistance from their peers or seniors to resolve any complex issues. They can internally exchange information and knowledge articles as and when required. Real-time call monitoring/barging system can be used by quality assessment team to provide important guidelines to agents to maintain the standard of the service as per industry norms. Integrated recording feature is helpful for internal training and quality purposes to improve productivity and customer satisfaction in equal measures. It also helps in getting business insights and improving products or services to gain deeper penetration into the market.

See also 
 Call centre

References

Telephony
Telecommunications